This is a list of lists of parks in New Zealand.

Parks by region

North Island
List of parks in the Auckland Region
List of parks in the Bay of Plenty Region
List of parks in the Gisborne District
List of parks in the Hawke's Bay Region
List of parks in the Manawatu-Wanganui Region
List of parks in the Northland Region
List of parks in the Taranaki Region
List of parks in the Waikato Region
List of parks in the Wellington Region

South Island and other islands
List of parks in the Canterbury Region
List of parks in the Chatham Islands
List of parks in the Marlborough Region
List of parks in Nelson, New Zealand
List of parks in the Otago Region
List of parks in the Southland Region
List of parks in the Tasman Region
List of parks in the West Coast Region

Parks by type

Forest parks
Great Walks
National parks
Regional parks

See also 
Lists of marae in New Zealand
Lists of schools in New Zealand

References